Castelnau-d'Estrétefonds is a railway station in Castelnau-d'Estrétefonds, Occitanie, France. The station is located on the Bordeaux–Sète railway. The station is served by TER (local) services operated by SNCF.

Train services
The following services currently call at Castelnau-d'Estrétefonds:
local service (TER Occitanie) Brive-la-Gaillarde – Cahors – Montauban – Toulouse
local service (TER Occitanie) Montauban – Toulouse
local service (TER Occitanie) Agen – Montauban – Toulouse

References

Railway stations in Haute-Garonne
Railway stations in France opened in 1856